Pogranichny District is an administrative and municipal district (raion), one of the twenty-two in Primorsky Krai, Russia. It is located in the southwest of the krai. Its administrative center is the urban locality (an urban-type settlement) of Pogranichny. Population:   The population of the administrative center accounts for 43.8% of the district's total population.

History
The district was established in 1926.

Notable residents 

Ruslan Gordiyenko (born 1995 in Pogranichny), football player

References

Notes

Sources

Districts of Primorsky Krai

